The 1921-22 season in Swedish football, starting August 1921 and ending February 1922:

Honours

Official titles

Competitions

Domestic results

Svenska Mästerskapet 1921 
Final

Kamratmästerskapen 1921 
Final

National team results 

 Sweden: 

 Sweden: 

 Sweden: 

 Sweden:

National team players in season 1921/22

Notes

References 
Print

Online

 
Seasons in Swedish football
, Swedish
, Swedish